Hoogeveen (or  't Oveine) is a municipality and a town in the Dutch province of Drenthe.

Population centres 
Elim, Fluitenberg, Hoogeveen and Noordscheschut, which still have the canals which used to be throughout the town.  Other villages of the town are Hollandscheveld, Nieuw Moscou, Nieuweroord, Nieuwlande, Pesse, Stuifzand and Tiendeveen.

History 
Hoogeveen dates its history to 20 December 1625, when Roelof van Echten bought a large tract of peat land from farmers of the district with the plan to harvest its peat.  One old map of the area called it Locus Deserta Atque ob Multos Paludes Invia, a deserted and impenetrable place of many swamps. Hoogeveen itself was established in 1636 by Peter Joostens Warmont and Johan van der Meer.

Its coat of arms, granted 10 November 1819, is white, with a pile of peat covered in straw in the center and beehives on each side, representing the town's first two major industries.

Vincent van Gogh visited the area in the fall of 1883.

In the second half of the 1960s, Hoogeveen was the fastest growing town in the Netherlands. Until that period, the town contained a number of canals, which had been dug in the area's early days when it was a prime source of peat and maritime transportation was a necessity for efficient transportation of cargo. By the 1960s the rise of the automobile and truck-based transportation meant the canals had lost much of their economic function, and the canals were filled in.

The first important transportation connection was provided by the railway line, with Hoogeveen railway station opening in 1870. Since the early 1970s, access to the town has been provided by the A28 (Utrecht - Groningen) highway, and in the early 2000s, the A37 (Hoogeveen - Germany) highway was expanded from a provincial road to improve the region's connection to Emmen and further to Germany.

The then recognized oldest person in the world, Hendrikje van Andel-Schipper, lived in Hoogeveen until her death in August 2005, two months after her 115th birthday.

Hoogeveen also has a small airport that attracts some tourism. Since 1997 the Hoogeveen Chess Tournament has been organized here.

Transport
Railway station: Hoogeveen

International relations

Twin towns — Sister cities
Hoogeveen is twinned with:

Notable people 

 Leopold Karel, Count of Limburg Stirum (1758 in Hoogeveen - 1840) a politician, helped take power in 1813 to re-establish the monarchy
 Herman Bavinck (1854 in Hoogeveen – 1921) a Dutch Reformed theologian and churchman
 Hendrikje van Andel-Schipper (1890 – 2005 in Hoogeveen) the oldest person ever from the Netherlands
 Jan Bols (born 1944 in Hoogeveen) a former Dutch long track speed skater, participated in the 1968 and 1972 Summer Olympics
 Geert Booij (born 1947 in Hoogeveen) a Dutch linguist and academic, created construction morphology
 Jetta Klijnsma (born 1957 in Hoogeveen) Dutch politician
 Senff (born 1971 in Hoogeveen) a Dutch/Canadian musician and actor
 Anne van Amstel (born 1974 in Hoogeveen) Dutch writer, psychologist and poet
 Lea Bouwmeester (born 1979 in Hoogeveen) a Dutch politician
 Jill de Jong (born 1982 in Hoogeveen) a Dutch model and actress

Sport 
 Piet Kleine (born 1951 in Hollandscheveld) a former speed skater, gold medallist at the 1976 Winter Olympics and silver medallist at the 1980 Winter Olympics
 Theo ten Caat (born 1964 in Hollandscheveld) a former Dutch professional footballer with 412 club caps
 Erik Dekker (born 1970) a retired Dutch professional road racing cyclist, medallist at the 1992 Summer Olympics
 Erik Bakker (born 1990 in Hoogeveen) a Dutch professional footballer with 320 club caps
 Vivianne Miedema (born 1996 in Hoogeveen) a Dutch professional footballer who is the Netherlands all-time top scorer, across both the women's and men's teams. She is also the all-time top scorer in the English FA Women's Super League.

Climate

Gallery

References

Footnotes

Bibliography
Dijk, Wout J., & van der Sluis, Meent W.: De Drentse tijd van Vincent van Gogh, Boon uitgeverij, Groningen 2001

External links

 
Populated places in Drenthe
Municipalities of Drenthe
Cities in the Netherlands
Populated places established in the 17th century